Staffan Larsson, (born 10 February 1970), is a Swedish former cross-country skier.

Larsson competed at an elite level from 1992 to 2005. He took part in the Vasaloppet on numerous occasions, and finished second in 1998 after a late finish from Peter Göransson. Larsson took revenge a year later (1999) when he won the Vasaloppet.

Cross-country skiing results
All results are sourced from the International Ski Federation (FIS).

World Cup

Season standings

References

Swedish male cross-country skiers
Vasaloppet winners
1970 births
Living people
IFK Mora skiers